Peace in Our Time, a phrase taken from the Book of Common Prayer, may refer to:

 "Peace for our time", a phrase spoken by British Prime Minister Neville Chamberlain regarding the Munich Agreement of 1938, frequently misquoted as "Peace in our time"

Film, television, and theatre
 Peace in Our Time (film) or The Silent Battle, a 1939 British film
 Peace in Our Time (play), a 1946 play by Noël Coward
 "Peace in Our Time", an episode of Please Sir!
 True Stories: Peace in Our Time?, a 1988 British television film featuring John Cleese as Neville Chamberlain

Music

Albums
 Peace in Our Time (Big Country album) or the title song (see below), 1988
 Peace in Our Time (Good Riddance album), 2015

Songs
 "Peace in Our Time" (Big Country song), 1989
 "Peace in Our Time" (Eddie Money song), by Jennifer Holliday, 1988; notably covered by Eddie Money (1989) and Cliff Richard (1993)
 "Peace in Our Time", by 10cc from Mirror Mirror, 1995
 "Peace in Our Time", by Carter the Unstoppable Sex Machine from Peace Together, 1993
 "Peace in Our Time", by Elvis Costello from Goodbye Cruel World, 1984
 "Peace in Our Time", by Gorky Park from Gorky Park, 1989
 "Peace in Our Time", by Ray Davies from Working Man's Café, 2007
 "Da pacem Domine", a Latin hymn whose traditional English translation includes the phrase "Give peace in our time, O Lord"

Other uses
 Peace in Our Time, a 1923 novel by Oliver Onions
 Peace in Our Time?, a 1985 non-fiction book by David Atkinson
 Peace in Our Time?, a 1991 non-fiction book by June Goodfield and Mary Fitzgerald
 Peace in Our Time, an expansion set to the wargame Europa

See also
 In Our Time (disambiguation)